Sir James William Alexander Burnet (12 July 192820 July 2012), known as Alastair Burnet, was a British journalist and broadcaster, best known for his work in news and current affairs programmes, including a long career with ITN as chief presenter of the flagship News at Ten; Sir Robin Day described Burnet as "the booster rocket that put ITN into orbit".

Burnet was also a prominent print journalist who edited The Economist and the Daily Express.

Early life
Burnet was born to Scottish parents in Sheffield, West Riding of Yorkshire, on 12 July 1928. He was educated at the Leys School, a boys' independent school in Cambridge, before reading history at Worcester College, Oxford.

Career in journalism
Upon graduating, Burnet began work as a reporter for the Glasgow Herald, before joining The Economist in 1958 as a sub-editor, leader writer, and subsequently, associate editor. He switched to television in 1963, becoming political editor for ITN. While reporting, he became a relief newscaster and worked on ITN's current affairs programmes including Roving Report, Dateline and Dateline Westminster. He was also the main anchor for the ITV network's coverage of the 1964, 1966 and 1970 general elections and the Apollo 11 Moon landing in 1969.

Burnet left ITN in 1965 to rejoin The Economist as editor, but continued broadcasting as a reporter and interviewer for Associated-Rediffusion's weekly current affairs programme This Week. He returned part-time to ITN in 1967 to launch News at Ten, presenting the first programme (during the show's thirteen-week pilot phase) on 3 July alongside Andrew Gardner, and also presented the short-lived topical interview series Man in the News in 1970. He switched to the BBC in 1972 to report and present for Panorama and Midweek and to anchor coverage of the February and October 1974 general election programmes, also covering the wedding of Princess Anne and Mark Phillips. He continued to edit The Economist until 1974, where he raised the circulation by 60%. He then joined the Daily Express as editor, but resigned 18 months later.

He rejoined ITN in June 1976, initially for a brief stint back on News at Ten, but in September 1976 he became the main presenter for the newly relaunched early evening bulletin News at 5:45. He returned to News at Ten in March 1978. Four years later, Burnet became an associate editor for the programme and joined the ITN board of directors. He continued to present coverage of political events including the 1979, 1983 and 1987 general elections, by-elections, budgets and American presidential elections.

Burnet also presented coverage of the royal family, commentating on the weddings of Prince Charles and Lady Diana Spencer in 1981, Prince Andrew and Sarah Ferguson in 1986 and other state occasions. He also wrote and presented several Royal documentaries including In Person: The Prince and Princess of Wales, A Royal Day and The Royal Family in Scotland. Outside of ITN, he was also a presenter and interviewer for Thames Television's TV Eye (for a time, a substitute for This Week).

In February 1990, Burnet resigned from the ITN board amid a dispute over the future ownership of the company, during which his own proposals to restructure the organisation were rejected. He retired from ITN as newscaster and associate editor 18 months later, presenting his final edition of News at Ten on 29 August 1991.

Personal life
Burnet was a supporter of Scottish football clubs Rangers and Partick Thistle.

Death
Following his retirement, he did not make any further appearances on television or write for the press. In part, this was because of his being diagnosed with dementia, following which the requirement for twenty-four-hour nursing resulted in his having to reside in the Beatrice Place Nursing Home in Kensington, London. His condition meant that he felt comfortable only with close friends; these included his wife, and also former ITN News director Diana Edwards-Jones. Burnet died peacefully in the early hours of 20 July 2012, at his nursing home in Kensington, where he had been living following a series of strokes. Paying tribute, Andrew Neil referred to Burnet as "Britain's greatest broadcaster".

In his will he left £2 million, most of it bequeathed to his wife.

Popular culture
The satirical TV puppet show Spitting Image portrayed Burnet as a fawning royalist, who behaved in an ingratiating manner towards the nearest available member of the Royal Family; one episode ended with the Burnet puppet singing a song about his love for the Queen Mother (before being pushed aside for Sandy Gall). The satirical magazine Private Eye referred to him as "Arslicker Burnet".

Honours
Burnet was knighted in the 1984 New Year Honours "for services to journalism and broadcasting".

He also won numerous awards, including the BAFTA Richard Dimbleby award three times in 1966, 1970 and 1979.

References

External links
ITV launches court bid over news BBC News, 27 July 2000
"My mentor: Newsreader Alastair Stewart on the anchor that steadied his career", The Guardian, 2 February 2008

Andrew Neil's eulogy for Burnet, November 2012

People from Sheffield
English people of Scottish descent
People educated at The Leys School
Alumni of Worcester College, Oxford
English male journalists
English magazine editors
English newspaper editors
English television presenters
The Economist editors
Daily Express people
ITN newsreaders and journalists
Knights Bachelor
Panorama (British TV programme)
1928 births
2012 deaths
Journalists from Yorkshire